Two Wives is a 2009 South Korean television series starring Kim Ji-young, Son Tae-young, Kim Ho-jin, and Kang Ji-sub. The daily drama aired on SBS on Mondays to Fridays at 19:20 from May 4 to October 30, 2009 for 120 episodes.

The series was part of the "Wife Trilogy," which includes Temptation of Wife and Wife Returns.

Plot
Kang Chul-soo (Kim Ho-jin) divorces his wife Yoon Young-hee (Kim Ji-young) to start anew with single mother Han Ji-sook (Son Tae-young), with whom he had carried on an affair. After the split, however, Chul-soo gets into a car accident and wakes up with no memory of Ji-sook. Chul-soo thinks he is still married to Young-hee, and Young-hee and everyone else can only play along while he recovers.

Cast

Main characters
Kim Ji-young as Yoon Young-hee
Son Tae-young as Han Ji-sook
Kim Ho-jin as Kang Chul-soo
Kang Ji-sub as Song Ji-ho

Supporting characters
Yoon family
Andy Lee as Yoon Nam-joon, Young-hee's younger brother
Jeon Moo-song as Yoon Jang-soo, Young-hee's father
Jo Yang-ja as Seo Yeo-ja, Young-hee's mother

Kang family
Kim Yoon-kyung as Kang Do-hee
Kim Yong-rim as Jang Young-ja, Chul-soo's mother
Kang Sung-jin as Ahn Kyung-tae
Kim Young-ran as Oh Dal-ja
Uhm Min-woo as Kang Han-byul, Young-hee and Chul-soo's son

Han family
Kim Su-jung as Han So-ri, Ji-sook's daughter

Extended cast
Lee Yoo-jin as Jo Mi-mi
Choi Won-young as Lee Young-min
Go Jung-min as Yoo Young-sun
Yoon Ji-min as Oh Hye-ran
Kim Hye-ok as Ji-ho's mother
Kim Na-young as Oh Ae-rang
Jung Tae-won as Dong-joon
Seol Ji-yoon as Dong-joon's mother
Jang Joon-ho as editor
Kang Soo-han as editor's son
Jung Ji-ah as Se-ri
Jung Chi-in
Min Ah-ryung
Jeon Sung-hwan
Yang Hee-kyung

Notes
This was actress Son Tae-young's return to the small screen after marrying Kwon Sang-woo and giving birth to a son.
Actress Kim Ji-young's real-life mother-in-law, Kim Yong-rim, portrayed her mother-in-law in this drama as well.

Awards
2009 SBS Drama Awards: Best Young Actress - Kim Su-jung

Adaptation

In 2014, ABS-CBN produced a Philippine remake based on Two Wives. The adaptation was originally aired from October 13, 2014 to March 13, 2015.

References

External links
Two Wives official SBS website 

Seoul Broadcasting System television dramas
Korean-language television shows
2009 South Korean television series debuts
2009 South Korean television series endings
South Korean romance television series
South Korean melodrama television series